Kapca is a village west of Lendava in the Prekmurje region of Slovenia.

The small church in the settlement is dedicated to Saint James and belongs to the Parish of Lendava.

References

External links
Kapca on Geopedia

Populated places in the Municipality of Lendava